The 2014 Firestone Grand Prix of St. Petersburg was the first race of the 2014 IndyCar Series season, the race took place on March 30 in St. Petersburg, Florida, on the city's temporary street course. The race was won by Will Power for Team Penske. Ryan Hunter-Reay finished second ahead of Hélio Castroneves, Scott Dixon, and Simon Pagenaud. The top finishing rookie in the race was Mikhail Aleshin, in 12th position.

Report

Background
Scott Dixon entered this race as the defending series champion, having won his third Indycar title in the 2013 IndyCar Series season from Hélio Castroneves.

This was the first race for 3 Indycar rookies. Jack Hawksworth raced in the number 98 for Bryan Herta Autosport after moving up from the Indy Lights series. Mikhail Aleshin and Carlos Huertas, who both raced in Formula Renault 3.5 in 2013, made their debuts as well, with Aleshin racing for Schmidt Peterson Hamilton Motorsports and Huertas Dale Coyne Racing. Carlos Muñoz was the 4th rookie in the field with 3 Indycar races in the 2013 IndyCar Series season, most notably the 2013 Indianapolis 500.

Returning to American open wheel racing, since his last race in 2000, is Juan Pablo Montoya, the 1999 CART Champion and the 2000 Indianapolis 500 winner. In 2014 he will drive for Team Penske in the number 2 car.

This was also the first race for Chip Ganassi Racing using Chevrolet engines after the switch from Honda, with Tony Kanaan replacing Dario Franchitti, after his career ending crash in the second Houston race last year. Other drivers racing for a new teams are; Ryan Briscoe with Chip Ganassi Racing, Mike Conway with Ed Carpenter Racing, Sébastien Bourdais and Sebastián Saavedra with KV Racing Technology.

Classification

Qualifying

Race results

Notes
 Points include 1 point for leading at least 1 lap during a race, an additional 2 points for leading the most race laps, and 1 point for Pole Position.

Championship standings after the race

Drivers' Championship standings

Manufacturer standings

 Note: Only the top five positions are included.

References

http://www.imscdn.com/INDYCAR/Documents/2888/2014-03-30/indycar-race-lapfinal.pdf
http://www.autosport.com/news/report.php/id/113203
http://www.indycar.com/News/2014/03/3-30-Box-Score-StPete

Firestone Grand Prix of St. Petersburg
Grand Prix of St. Petersburg
Grand Prix of St. Petersburg
21st century in St. Petersburg, Florida
Firestone Grand Prix of St. Petersburg